Zvonko Živković (Serbian Cyrillic: Звонко Живковић; born 31 October 1959) is a Serbian football manager and former player.

Playing career
Živković spent eight seasons at Partizan, before moving to Benfica in 1986. He also played for Fortuna Düsseldorf and Dijon, before retiring in 1991.

Živković made five appearances for the Yugoslav national team and scored two goals. He was also a member of the team at the 1982 FIFA World Cup.

Coaching career
Živković was the head coach of the Serbia and Montenegro national under-19 team from 2004 to 2005. With him, they reached the semifinals of the 2005 UEFA European Under-19 Championship. Živković also led the Serbian national under-19 team to the 2007 UEFA European Under-19 Championship.

Honours
Partizan
 Yugoslav First League: 1982–83, 1985–86

External links
 
 

1959 births
Living people
Footballers from Belgrade
Yugoslav footballers
Serbian footballers
Yugoslavia international footballers
1982 FIFA World Cup players
Association football forwards
FK Partizan players
Yugoslav First League players
S.L. Benfica footballers
Primeira Liga players
Fortuna Düsseldorf players
2. Bundesliga players
Dijon FCO players
Ligue 2 players
Serbian expatriate footballers
Yugoslav expatriate footballers
Expatriate footballers in Portugal
Expatriate footballers in Germany
Expatriate footballers in France
Serbian football managers
Serbian SuperLiga managers
FK Metalac Gornji Milanovac managers
FK Partizan non-playing staff
FK Teleoptik managers
Serbia national under-21 football team managers